The Philippine Basketball Association season scoring leaders are the season by season individual scoring leaders of the Philippine Basketball Association (PBA) by a local (natural born Filipino). It originally started during the 1975 season, but it became an official award when the PBA Awards Press Corps started its official recognition of the award during the 2011–12 season.

The incumbent holder of the said award is CJ Perez of the Columbian Dyip.

Scoring leaders

Multiple time winners

See also
 List of Philippine Basketball Association awards

References

External links
 PBA at Asia-Basket.com 

Scoring
1997 establishments in the Philippines
Awards established in 1997